Emilia Justyna Powell is a Polish-American political scientist. She is Professor of Political Science and Concurrent Professor of Law at the University of Notre Dame and is known for her expertise on international dispute resolution, the Islamic legal tradition, Islamic international law, and Islamic constitutionalism.

Career
Justyna Powell received her PhD from Florida State University in 2007. In 2011, she was hired by the University of Notre Dame as an assistant professor in their Political Science Department. She has been a fellow at the Oxford Centre for Islamic Studies, and at the Centre of Excellence for International Courts. 
Powell has published several papers in top academic journals including International Organization, Journal of Politics, International Studies Quarterly, Journal of Peace Research, Journal of Conflict Resolution, Law and Contemporary Problems, and Yearbook of Arab Association of Constitutional Law.

Books
Domestic Law Goes Global: Legal Traditions and International Courts (with Sara McLaughlin Mitchell), Cambridge University Press 2011
Islamic Law and International Law: Peaceful Settlement of Disputes, Oxford University Press 2020

References

External links
Emilia Justyna Powell's Official Website
Emilia Justyna Powell at the University of Notre Dame

University of Notre Dame faculty
University of Alabama faculty
International relations scholars
Florida State University alumni
Nicolaus Copernicus University in Toruń alumni
People from Toruń
Living people
American women political scientists
American political scientists
Year of birth missing (living people)
American women academics
21st-century American women